The Railway and Canal Commission was a British court of record, established by the Railway and Canal Traffic Act 1888 and abolished by the Railway and Canal Commission (Abolition) Act 1949.

The Regulation of Railways Act 1873 established the Railway Commissioners, created to carry into effect the provisions of the Railway and Canal Traffic Act 1854. When the 1873 Act expired, Parliament established the Railway and Canal Commission in 1888. It originally consisted of five commissioners.

The jurisdiction of the Commission having been progressively whittled down, it was abolished in 1949. Its last member, Sir Francis Taylor, was elevated to the peerage as Baron Maenan shortly before its abolition.

External links

 Railway and Canal Commission at The National Archives

Former courts and tribunals in the United Kingdom
1873 establishments
1888 establishments
1949 disestablishments
Transport authorities in the United Kingdom